Aurantibacter crassamenti is a Gram-negative, strictly aerobic, chemoheterotrophic and rod-shaped bacterium from the genus of Aurantibacter which has been isolated from marine sediments from Japan.

References 

Flavobacteria
Bacteria described in 2017